Jérôme Pradon (born 3 June 1964) is a French actor and singer who has performed in the West End, in Paris and in various other places around the world. He was born in Boulogne-Billancourt, Hauts-de-Seine, France.

Theatre 

In 1991, Pradon made his musical debut in Alain Boublil and Claude-Michel Schönberg's Les Misérables, as Marius at the Theatre Mogador in Paris. This show led to his first West End appearance: playing the role of Chris in Miss Saigon (1992–93). He followed this with a debut in Toronto, Canada, where he originated the title role of Napoleon (1994).

In 1995, travelling back and forth between France and England, Pradon performed in several productions including La Java des Mémoires, directed by Roger Louret and Assassins by Stephen Sondheim. Later that year he played the role of student revolutionary Courfeyrac in the 10th anniversary run of Les Misérables.

Remaining in London, Pradon created the role of Guillaume in the Olivier Award winning production Martin Guerre, which made him the first actor to have performed major roles in all three Boublil and Schonberg musicals. After that came Maury Yeston's Nine at the Folies Bergère, where Pradon played Guido Contini, the sole male role.

In 1998 Pradon performed in Killing Rasputin, and in 2000 performed in Black Goes with Everything (a show celebrating the talent of Don Black) and Andrew Lloyd Webber's Whistle Down the Wind where he played the role of The Man alongside Laura Michelle Kelly as Swallow. In 2000, he also appeared in the role of Judas in a production of Jesus Christ Superstar, opposite Glenn Carter as Jesus. This production is available on DVD.

Pradon attended the 2001 Edinburgh Festival Fringe with his one-man show Crime of Passion, a British premiere. This was followed by another one-man show, in Paris, Road Movie. Not only did Pradon perform all five roles in the play, he translated the text into French. He later reprised this show in 2002. Also that year, he was a principal performer in Délit D’Ivresse, the last piece by Roland Petit; took part in the spectacular gala charity concert A Night Of 1000 Voices; played Javert in Les Misérables at the Palace Theatre, London, and performed at the Opening Gala for the first International Festival of Musical Theatre in Cardiff.

2003 saw the creation of the award-winning Pacific Overtures, for which Pradon was nominated for an Olivier Award for his portrayal of the murderous Shogun's mother and the hilarious French Admiral. This was followed by Et Si On Chantait?, produced by Pierre Cardin, and the award-winning Chance!

2004 saw Pradon perform in One Day More! a symphonic concert celebrating Boublil and Schönberg's works; perform for Queen Elizabeth II and President Jacques Chirac at Windsor Castle in a Les Misérables concert, as part of the marking of the 100th anniversary of the Entente Cordiale; and play King Herod in the Scandinavian tour of Jesus Christ Superstar.

In 2005, Pradon made his Liège debut in Maury Yeston's Titanic. In 2006, he performed at the Les Musicals Festival in Béziers and was also nominated as Best Actor for the year of 2005. Later that year, Pradon starred as several different characters in the Molière Award winning Le Cabaret Des Hommes Perdus. This multi-award-winning musical was such a hit that it extended its run into 2007. From Paris to London, Pradon took on the role of Aragorn in the European premiere of The Lord of the Rings.
In 2008, Pradon took over the role of Scar in the West End production of Disney's The Lion King.

Pradon's next project was L'Opera De Sarah, which was performed in Paris in 2009. He next appeared in the French production of Mamma Mia! in the part of Sam.

in 2019 he played the role of George in Aspects of Love at the Southwark Playhouse.

TV and film 
TV and film appearances include his first paid acting job Marcheloup, L'été ‘36, Cas De Divorce and Hélas Pour Moi directed by Jean Luc Goddard. Sharpe’s Company took Pradon to Ukraine for filming and onto British screens. Kung Fu: The Legend Continues was filmed during his time in Napoleon. The Brylcreem Boys (for which he was asked to emphasize the French accent more) was released in limited UK cinemas in 1999. Also that year, Simon Sez, seeing Pradon play the villain of the movie, was released in the US.

French productions include Belle Grand-Mere, La Jeune Fille et La Tortue directed by Stéphane Ly-Cuong; the award winning Crimes En Serie, Avocats et Associés and film festival winner Paradisco, also directed by Stéphane Ly-Cuong.

English speaking productions include RTS Award nominated Aristocrats; Oscar nominated Vatel directed by Roland Joffé; The Dancer playing The Director; the International Emmy award winning 2000 version of Jesus Christ Superstar, playing Judas for which his performance received rave reviews and a new collection of fans; Peter Ackroyd's London and Carrie and Barry starring Neil Morrissey.

In 2004, he organised the casting for and performed the part of André in the French dubbing of the 2004 The Phantom of the Opera movie.

2006 saw the sitcom The Complete Guide to Parenting, starring Peter Davison, that was broadcast on ITV, with Jérôme playing the part of Roland, and 2007 saw Jérôme starring in Trafalgar, directed by Fabrice Hourlier.

Radio 

Radio credits include National Music Day, numerous appearances on Friday Night Is Music Night and Somewhere In The Desert.

Pradon is also a songwriter. He has written songs for Jean Guidoni's Tigre de Porcelaine album as well as for himself (he released the single "Tendrement", 1987). He is working on a pop, rock and electro album.

Discography 
The Lord of the Rings (2007)
Le Cabaret Des Hommes Perdus (2006)
Les Bienheureux De La Marge Brute (2005)
Chance! (2004)
Crime of Passion (2001)
Jesus Christ Superstar (2000)
Killing Rasputin (1999)
Martin Guerre (1996)
Les Misérables - 10th Anniversary Concert (1995)
Napoleon (1994)
Les Misérables (1991)

Singles
Tendrement (1987)

External links
Jérôme Pradon's official website

I Will Make You Proud - Fansite
Love At First Site - Fansite
Skye's Pradon Parade

1964 births
Living people
People from Boulogne-Billancourt
French male stage actors
French male musical theatre actors
French male film actors
French male television actors